"The Deeper the Love" is a power ballad by the English hard rock band Whitesnake, taken from their 1989 album Slip of the Tongue. It was written by singer David Coverdale, along with guitarist Adrian Vandenberg.

Overview
Coverdale commented on the origins of the song in Slip of the Tongue 20th anniversary edition liner notes by saying:"The Deeper the Love" came from a chorus sequence I'd had for some time, written, if memory serves, in my dear friend Tony Z's house, many years ago... then my little Dutch brother, Adrian, came along and put the musical icing on the cake, and gave me the verse chord sequence. I finished writing it in Tahiti [...] very early in the morning with the sun rising over the Pacific.

"The Deeper the Love" was released as the album's second single in early 1990. It was a Top 40 chart success in the UK, the US, Canada and Ireland. It also reached number 4 on the Mainstream Rock Tracks charts in the US.

The song was performed in its original form for the 1990 Slip of the Tongue tour, but after that it has only been performed in acoustic form, which was first seen and heard on 1998's Starkers in Tokyo.

Music video
The music video for "The Deeper the Love" was directed by Marty Callner. It features the band performing on a large stage, with big headlights that also have the Slip of the Tongue album cover on them. There are also scenes of David Coverdale in a hallway that also have walls covered with Slip of the Tongues cover, and Adrian Vandenberg playing the piano on a stairwell. The video features David Coverdale's then-wife, actress Tawny Kitaen, who has also appeared in the music videos for "Is This Love", "Here I Go Again '87" and "Still of the Night", all from the band's previous album.

Track listing
All tracks written by David Coverdale and Adrian Vandenberg, except where noted.7" SingleA. "The Deeper the Love" – 4:23
B. "Judgement Day" – 5:1512" SingleA. "The Deeper the Love" – 4:23
B1. "Judgement Day" – 5:15
B1. "Sweet Lady Luck" – 4:37Cassette SingleA. "The Deeper the Love" – 4:23
B. "Slip of the Tongue" – 5:20CD Single'
 "The Deeper the Love" – 4:19
 "Judgement Day" – 5:10
 "Sweet Lady Luck" – 4:35
 "Fool for Your Loving" (Coverdale, Micky Moody, Bernie Marsden) – 4:21

Personnel
David Coverdale – lead vocals
Steve Vai – guitars
Adrian Vandenberg – guitars (credited, but does not actually appear)
Rudy Sarzo – bass guitar
Tommy Aldridge – drums
Don Airey – keyboards

Charts

References

Whitesnake songs
1989 songs
1990 singles
EMI Records singles
Music videos directed by Marty Callner
Song recordings produced by Keith Olsen
Songs written by Adrian Vandenberg
Songs written by David Coverdale
Virgin Records singles
1980s ballads
Glam metal ballads
Geffen Records singles